The 2021 St Helens Metropolitan Borough Council election took place on 6 May 2021 to elect members of St Helens Council in England. This was on the same day as other local elections. One-third of the seats were up for election, with one ward (Earlestown) electing two councillors.

Results

Ward results

Billinge and Seneley Green

Blackbrook

Bold

Earlestown

Eccleston

Haydock

Moss Bank

Newton

Parr

Rainford

Rainhill

Sutton

Thatto Heath

Town Centre

West Park

Windle

References 

Saint Helens
Council elections in the Metropolitan Borough of St Helens